Imtiar Shamim is a Bangladeshi novelist and writer. He was born in 1965 in the district of Sirajganj. He studied sociology at Rajshahi University. He has worked as a journalist and editor at several newspapers in Bangladesh. As a writer, he is best known for his novels and short stories. He was awarded the Bangla Academy Prize for fiction in 2021.

Works

Novels
 ডানাকাটা হিমের ভেতর
 আমরা হেঁটেছি যারা
 অন্ধ মেয়েটি জ্যোৎস্না দেখার পর
 চরসংবেগ
 মৃত্যুগন্ধী বিকেলে সুশীল সংগীতানুষ্ঠান

Short stories
 শীতঘুমে এক জীবন
 গ্রামায়নের ইতিকথা
 মাৎস্যন্যায়ের বাকপ্রতিমা
 কয়েকটি মৃত মুনিয়া
 আত্মহত্যার সপক্ষে
 মৃত্তিকা প্রাক-পুরাতন

References

Bangladeshi male novelists